Nostalgia is a 2022 Italian-French drama film co-written and directed by Mario Martone, based on a 2016 novel by Ermanno Rea.

The film premiered at the 75th Cannes Film Festival in May 2022, in the official competition for Palme d'Or. The following month, the film won four Nastro d'Argento Awards, for best director, best actor, best supporting actor, and best screenplay.

Plot
The film follows Felice, a man who returns to his hometown of Naples to visit his ill mother after spending 40 years living in Egypt, where he also converted to Islam, and married an Egyptian woman. Most of the film is set in the impoverished Rione Sanità area of Naples, where Felice first visits his mother and later meets local priest Don Luigi. Felice eventually tells Luigi in a sort of confession that in one of the petty thefts carried out by him and his childhood friend Oreste, the latter killed the owner of a local carpentry shop. Don Luigi throws him out of the church, telling him that Oreste had in the meantime risen to become a dangerous boss of the Camorra, the local organized crime syndicate.

A friend of Felice's mother warns him of danger and urges him to escape from Naples. Don Luigi then introduces Felice to a Camorra family, and during dinner he drinks wine for the very first time, becomes uninhibited, and talks about his childhood spent with Oreste, making everyone speechless. At this point Felice goes to visit the aged Oreste. Oreste, angry because of his friend's abandonment four decades earlier, follows him into an alley, kills him and steals his wallet – and finds inside an old photo of the two of them on a motorbike.

Cast

 Pierfrancesco Favino as Felice Lasco
 Francesco Di Leva as Father Luigi Rega
 Tommaso Ragno as Oreste Spasiano
 Aurora Quattrocchi as Teresa Lasco
 Sofia Essaïdi as Arlette
 Nello Mascia as Raffaele
 Emanuele Palumbo as Felice (young)
 Artem Tkachuk as Oreste (young)
 Salvatore Striano as Gegé
 Virginia Apicella as Adele
Daniela Ioia as Teresa (young)

Reception

Critical response
On the review aggregator website Rotten Tomatoes, 91% of 11 critics gave the film a positive review. On Metacritic, the film has a weighted average score of 75 out of 100, based on 6 reviews, indicating "generally favorable reviews".

Lovia Gyarkye of The Hollywood Reporter praised acting performances by Favino and Ragno, Martone's direction and Paolo Carnera's camerawork, calling it a "surprisingly absorbing film" but adding that its exploration of nostalgia "gets telegraphed to the point of exhaustion." Peter Bradshaw's review in The Guardian described the film as "tremendously shot and terrifically acted," adding that the film "challenges the idea of nostalgia as broadcast in the title: it isn’t simply that nostalgia is delusional, or that the past wasn’t as great as it appears when viewed through rose-tinted spectacles. It is that there is no past and present."

Accolades 
Nostalgia had its world premiere at the Cannes Film Festival on 24 May 2022, where it was screened as part of the official selection along with 20 other films competing for Palme d'Or. The film was released in Italy the following day, on 25 May 2022, just in time to qualify for the annual 2022 Nastro d'Argento (Silver Ribbon) Awards handed out by the Italian national association of film critics SNGCI, in a ceremony held on 20 June 2022 at the MAXXI museum in Rome, where it received seven nominations and four wins. 

These included Best Actor award for Favino—his fifth Silver Ribbon in that category, making him one of the most acclaimed Italian actors in history–and Best Director for Martone, who received the accolade for his work on both Nostalgia and his earlier film The King of Laughter (Qui rido io) released in September 2021.

The film was also screened at the Motovun Film Festival in July 2022, where it competed for the main award, the Propeller of Motovun.

See also
 List of submissions to the 95th Academy Awards for Best International Feature Film
 List of Italian submissions for the Academy Award for Best International Feature Film

References

External links
 

2022 films
2022 drama films
Italian drama films
French drama films
2020s Italian films
2020s French films
2020s Italian-language films
Films directed by Mario Martone
Films shot in Naples
Films set in Naples